Jere Austin (1876–1927) was an American silent film actor from Minnesota. He was born John Van Akin Austin and he began in films in 1914 and made his last appearance in Cecil B. DeMille's King of Kings (1927). Austin had entered films with the Kalem Company.

Austin died of cancer.

Filmography 

Chest of Fortune (1914) short
Wolfe; Or, The Conquest of Quebec (1914)
Nina o' the Theatre (1914) short
The Weakling (1914) short
The Old Army Coat (1914) short
Kit, The Arkansaw Traveler (1914) short
The Green Rose (1914) short
The Viper (1914) short
Fate's Midnight Hour (1914) short
The Lynbrook Tragedy (1914) short
The Riddle of the Green Umbrella (1914) short
The Theft of the Crown Jewels (1914) short
The Price of Silence (1914) short
The School for Scandal (1914) short
The Mayor's Secretary (1914) short
Cast Up by the Sea (1915) short
The Swindler (1915) short
The White Goddess (1915) short
Unfaithful to His Trust (1915) short
The Lure of Mammon (1915) short
When the Mind Sleeps (1915) short
Over Night (1915)
The Romance of the Hollow Tree (1916) short
For Uncle Sam's Navy (1916) short
The Seven Swans (1917)
Resurrection (1918)
All Woman (1918)
Uncle Tom's Cabin (1918) 
Peg o' the Sea (1918)
Fedora (1918)
Hidden Fires (1918)
A Perfect Lady (1918)
Day Dreams (1919)
The Woman on the Index (1919)
The Trap (1919)
Erstwhile Susan (1919)
The Eternal Mother (1920)
Why Leave Your Husband? (1920)
The Woman Game (1920)
The Wakefield Case (1921) (as Jerry Austin)
The Splendid Lie (1922)
Cardigan (1922)
His Mystery Girl (1923)
 Pure Grit (1923)
Single Wives (1924)
Sundown (1924)
A Regular Fellow (1925) (as Jerry Austin)
The Storm Breaker (1925)
The Cowboy and the Countess (1926)
The Demon (1926)
The Desperate Game (1926)
The Mad Racer (1926) short

References

External links

 

1876 births
1927 deaths
American male silent film actors
20th-century American male actors
American male stage actors
Male actors from Minneapolis